Stavanger Station is a railway station in Stavanger municipality in Rogaland county, Norway. It is located in the centre of the city of Stavanger and it is the terminus of the Sørlandet Line. The station is served by regional trains to Kristiansand and the Jæren Commuter Rail.

History

The station was opened in 1872 as part of Jæren Line from Stavanger to Egersund. In 1944 it became part of the Sørlandet Line when it was concluded between Egersund and Kristiansand. A restaurant was established in a barracks next to the station by Norsk Spisevognselskap on 15 June 1946.
There is a bus terminal at the station, and boat and ferry port nearby.

References

External links

Stavanger Station profile (in Norwegian)

Railway stations on the Sørlandet Line
Railway stations in Stavanger
Railway stations opened in 1878
1878 establishments in Norway